Blackfly Tuya is a tuya in northern British Columbia, Canada. It is one of several volcanoes in the Tuya volcanic field and is adjacent to West Vent, Volcano Vent and Grizzly Butte which comprise the West Tuya lava field.

See also
 List of volcanoes in Canada
 Volcanism of Western Canada

References

Cassiar Country
One-thousanders of British Columbia
Volcanoes of British Columbia
Tuyas of Canada
Northern Cordilleran Volcanic Province
Stikine Ranges
Pleistocene volcanoes
Monogenetic volcanoes